The coat of arms of Palestine may refer to the emblem used by the State of Palestine and Palestinian National Authority (PNA) or to the emblem used by the Palestine Liberation Organization (PLO).

Official description
The government of Palestine describes the coat of arms as follows:

The Palestinian emblem is an eagle covered by the Palestinian flag, and it is similar to the emblems of Egypt and Iraq with a difference in the colors of the flags.

This emblem appeared at the beginning of the era of the Ayyubid state, which was founded by Sultan Salah al-Din al-Ayyubi in Egypt after the elimination of the Fatimid caliphate. It has become a symbol of the Ayyubid state since the era of Sultan Salahuddin al-Ayyubi, and represents Arab victories.

The eagle looks to the right with its head held high.

PNA and state emblem
The emblem used by the Palestinian National Authority as well as the State of Palestine features the pan-Arab colors of the Palestinian flag on a shield carried by the Eagle of Saladin. Below it flies a scroll with the Arabic text  "", "Palestine". 

An alternate version stating "" or "The Palestinian Authority" was used by the Palestinian National Authority, alongside the version stating "Palestine", but this was discontinued following the upgrade of the State of Palestine to a non-member state status in the United Nations on 29 November 2012 and the renaming of the Palestinian National Authority to "State of Palestine" by presidential decree in January 2013.

PLO emblem
The emblem of the Palestine Liberation Organization (PLO) shows the Palestinian flag above a map of "Palestine from the river to the sea", i.e. Palestine under the British Mandate (covering present-day Israel, the West Bank, and the Gaza Strip).

Gallery

See also
 Public Seal of Mandatory Palestine
Coat of arms of Iraq
Coat of arms of Egypt
Coat of arms of Syria
Coat of arms of Sudan
Coat of arms of Libya
Coat of arms of Yemen
Eagle of Saladin

References

National symbols of the State of Palestine
Palestine
Palestine
Palestine